Keng-Suu is a village in the Tüp District of Issyk-Kul Region of Kyrgyzstan. Its population was 2,340 in 2021.

The village is the birthplace of current President of Kyrgyzstan Sadyr Japarov.

References

Populated places in Issyk-Kul Region